Qian Qian (born March 1962) is a Chinese biologist currently serving as researcher and vice-president of the China National Rice Research Institute. He is also president of the State Key Laboratory of Rice Biology.

Education
Qian was born in Anqing, Anhui in March 1962. He attended the Anqing No. 2 High School. In 1983 he graduated from Nankai University. He received his  master's degree from Hokkaido University in 1989 and doctor's degree from Chinese Academy of Agriculture Sciences in 1995, respectively.

Career
In July 1983 he joined the China National Rice Research Institute, becoming a researcher in 2001 and vice-president in 2013.

In May 1996 he joined the Jiusan Society. From 2002 to 2003 he was a visiting scholar at Okayama University. In 2017 he was elected a member of the Standing Committee of the 14th Central Committee of Jiusan Society.

Honours and awards
 2017 State Natural Science Award (First Class) 
 November 22, 2019 Member of the Chinese Academy of Sciences (CAS)

References

External links
Qian Qian on the China National Rice Research Institute 

1962 births
People from Anqing
Living people
Nankai University alumni
Hokkaido University alumni
Members of the Chinese Academy of Sciences
Biologists from Anhui
Members of the Jiusan Society